Frea senilis is a species of beetle in the family Cerambycidae. It was described by White in 1858. It is known from the Democratic Republic of the Congo, and Sierra Leone.

References

senilis
Beetles described in 1858